Real Sport Clube are a Portuguese football which is based in Queluz. During the 2017-18 campaign it will be competing in the following competitions: LigaPro, Taça de Portugal and Taça da Liga.

Competitions

Liga Pro

League table

Results summary

Results by matchday

Matches

Taca da Liga

Taca da Portugal

References

External links
 
 Squad at Zerozero

Real SC